Arrabalde is a municipality located in the province of Zamora, Castile and León, Spain. , the municipality has a population of 294 inhabitants.

References

Municipalities of the Province of Zamora